Paul James Hutchison (17 February 1968 – 27 February 2015) was a professional Australian cricketer who played for Tasmania and South Australia. He was born in Glen Innes, New South Wales

Hutchison also played for Queensland Country and Queensland academy, as well as playing club cricket in the Northern Territory. Hutchison had two sons, Mitchell and James who often visited during his debut performances while playing professionally for South Australia and Tasmania.

See also
 List of Tasmanian representative cricketers

External links
Cricinfo profile

1968 births
2015 deaths
Australian cricketers
Tasmania cricketers
South Australia cricketers
Cricketers from New South Wales
People from New England (New South Wales)